Alison Hittmann ( Feast, born 27 August 1966), also known as Alison Feast-Hittmann, is an Australian sport shooter. She competed in rifle shooting events at the 1988 Summer Olympics.

Olympic results

References

External links
 
 
 
 

1966 births
Living people
ISSF rifle shooters
Australian female sport shooters
Shooters at the 1988 Summer Olympics
Olympic shooters of Australia